North God is the third studio album by South African American hip hop recording artist Da L.E.S, released on November 27, 2015, through Fresh 2 Def Records and Sony Music Entertainment Africa.

Background 
Recording sessions for the album started in 2014 after the release of his sophomore album Mandela Money. Da L.E.S has reportedly entered the studio with South African DJ Dimplez, and rappers Ma-E and Kid X from the Cashtime Life hip hop collective.

Promotion 
The album was made available for pre-order on iTunes on November 13, 2015 and released officially on November 27, 2015.

On December 3, 2015, Da L.E.S launched an album release party and concert at Melrose Arch in Johannesburg. He partnered with iTunes to ensure that the first 150 people to pre-order his album will get free access to the event.

The North God Album Launch Concert was sponsored by Cîroc (for which he is a South African Ambassador), V.A.M. and Sony Music Entertainment Africa. The supporting acts for the album launch concert included AKA, Riky Rick, Tamara Dey, Tumi, Sphum and DJ Milkshake as well as Ma-E, Maggz, Kid X and Nomuzi aka Moozlie.

Singles 
The first official single off the album, titled "P.A.I.D", was released on June 13, 2015, and contains features from frequent collaborators, fellow South African hip hop recording artist AKA and Nigerian dance-hall singer Burna Boy.

The second official single, titled "Summer Time" was released on September 25, 2015, and contains features and production from fellow South African hip hop record producer, Riky Rick.

DJ Milkshake's single "Bank Roll" which was released on October 9, 2015, and features vocals from Da L.E.S and Kid X, will serve as a single on the album.

Track listing

References 

2015 albums
Da L.E.S albums